Bojan Pečar (Serbian Cyrillic: Бојан Печар) (22 March 1960, in Belgrade – 13 October 1998, in London) was a Yugoslav and Serbian musician, best known as bass player of the cult Yugoslav rock band Ekatarina Velika. Previously he was a member of the new wave group VIA Talas, who were featured on the Yugoslav new wave compilation album Artistička radna akcija. He died on 13 October 1998 in London, England, officially of a heart attack, and was buried in Progar, outside Belgrade, Serbia.

Discography

Albums
With VIA Talas
Artistička radna akcija (various artist compilation, 1981)
Perfektan dan za banana ribe (1983)

With Katarina II / Ekatarina Velika
Katarina II (1984)
Ekatarina Velika (1985)
S vetrom uz lice (1986)
Ljubav (1987)
Samo par godina za nas (1989)

See also
Yugoslav rock
Serbian rock

References

External links
Interview with Bojan Pečar, Ćao magazine, 1989 
 

New wave musicians
Yugoslav musicians
Serbian rock bass guitarists
Serbian people of Slovenian descent
1960 births
1998 deaths
Post-punk musicians
Musicians from Belgrade
20th-century bass guitarists